Mehrdad Tahmasebi (born 10 September 1985) is an Iranian footballer who plays in the Persian Gulf League.

Club career
He started his career with Pas Tehran at youth levels. In summer 2012, he signed a two-year contract with Saba Qom.

Club Career Statistics
Last Update  15 May 2015

References

External links
 Mehrdad Tahmasbi at Persianleague.com
 Mehrdad Tahmasbi on Facebook

1985 births
Living people
Saba players
Iranian footballers
Persian Gulf Pro League players
Azadegan League players
Nassaji Mazandaran players
Sanati Kaveh players
Etka Gorgan players
People from Behshahr
Association football goalkeepers
Sportspeople from Mazandaran province